Live in Los Angeles is a promotional live album by Paul McCartney recorded during a secret performance on 27 June 2007 at Amoeba Music in Hollywood, California. The album was released only in the United Kingdom and Ireland through a special promotion run by The Mail on Sunday and the Irish Sunday Mail.

Four of the album's twelve tracks (2, 4, 5, and 12) were previously released on McCartney's 2007 EP, Amoeba's Secret, while track 3 was previously released as b-side to "Ever Present Past" single.

On 16 November 2012, the Paul McCartney website released an extended version of the Amoeba show titled Live in Los Angeles – The Extended Set free to "premium" members of the website, adding the songs "Nod Your Head" and "House of Wax" to the tracklisting, the latter also being a b-side to "Ever Present Past" single.

All the tracks from the album later appeared on the 2019 live album Amoeba Gig in a remixed form.

Track listing

Live in Los Angeles standard edition
"Drive My Car" (John Lennon, Paul McCartney) – 2:33
"Only Mama Knows" (McCartney) – 3:54
"Dance Tonight" (McCartney) – 3:09
"C Moon" (McCartney, Linda McCartney) – 3:22
"That Was Me" (McCartney) – 3:02
"Blackbird" (Lennon, McCartney) – 2:37
"Here Today" (McCartney) – 2:38
"Back in the U.S.S.R." (Lennon, McCartney) – 2:59
"Get Back" (Lennon, McCartney) – 3:53
"Hey Jude" (Lennon, McCartney) – 7:08
"Lady Madonna" (Lennon, McCartney) – 3:12
"I Saw Her Standing There" (McCartney, Lennon) – 3:25

Live in Los Angeles – The Extended Set edition

Personnel
 Paul McCartney – lead vocals, bass guitar, acoustic guitar, keyboards
 Rusty Anderson – lead guitar
 Abe Laboriel Jr. – drums
 Brian Ray – rhythm guitar, bass guitar
 David Arch – keyboards

Notes

Paul McCartney live albums
2010 live albums